Nader Rahmati (born 18 April 1966) is an Iranian former wrestler who competed in the 1992 Summer Olympics.

References

1966 births
Living people
Olympic wrestlers of Iran
Wrestlers at the 1992 Summer Olympics
Iranian male sport wrestlers
Asian Games gold medalists for Iran
Asian Games medalists in wrestling
Wrestlers at the 1994 Asian Games
Medalists at the 1994 Asian Games
Asian Wrestling Championships medalists
20th-century Iranian people
21st-century Iranian people